Peter Martin Hoekstra (born 4 April 1973) is a Dutch former professional footballer who played as a winger for PSV Eindhoven, Ajax and Stoke City. Capped 5 times by the Dutch national team, he was a member of the Dutch squad at Euro 1996 in England under manager Guus Hiddink.

Club career
Hoekstra started his career at PSV Eindhoven where he played for 5 years, making over 100 appearances for the club. Ajax Amsterdam signed him for £2m in 1996 to replace Marc Overmars. Injuries halted his career at Ajax and he was loaned out to Spanish side SD Compostela in 1999 and Dutch side FC Groningen in 2000.

Hoekstra made a total of 68 league appearances in 5 years with Ajax before signing with English Second Division side Stoke City in August 2001. Hoekstra's skill caused problems for many defences in English football's third tier and he was often subject to heavy tackles from opponents. He made 28 appearances for Stoke in 2001–02 helping them gain promotion in the 2002 play-off final. He scored three goals that season against Notts County and twice against Chesterfield. In 2002–03 Stoke battled against relegation from the First Division and Hoekstra's experience proved to be a vital asset, playing in 33 matches scoring five goals including a brace against Watford and a winning goal against Preston North End. In 2003–04 Hoekstra played 27 times scoring four goals including a hat-trick against Reading. In May 2004, at aged just 31, he was forced to retire due to a buildup of injuries.

He was voted as the best Stoke player to play in the first ten years at the Britannia Stadium in 2008. He is now a youth coach at FC Groningen with whom he made a visit to Stoke in April 2011.

International career
Hoekstra made his debut for the Netherlands on 24 April 1996 in a friendly against Germany (0–1) in Rotterdam. He was then selected to play for the Netherlands in the 1996 European Championship in England. Hoekstra played 5 times for his country, without scoring a goal.

Career statistics

Club
Sources:

International
Source:

References

External links
 CV Peter Hoekstra
 Vintage Profiles – Peter Hoekstra
 

1973 births
Living people
Dutch footballers
Dutch expatriate footballers
Netherlands international footballers
Association football wingers
AFC Ajax players
PSV Eindhoven players
Stoke City F.C. players
FC Groningen players
SD Compostela footballers
Eredivisie players
La Liga players
English Football League players
UEFA Euro 1996 players
People from Assen
Expatriate footballers in England
Expatriate footballers in Spain
Dutch expatriate sportspeople in England
Dutch expatriate sportspeople in Spain
Footballers from Drenthe